Chuang Chia-chia (born 13 May 1989) is a Taiwanese taekwondo practitioner.

Chuang later served as director of the Taoyuan Department of Sports. In March 2019, Chuang disclosed that she had been suspended from competition for a period of two years since 3 October 2017. World Taekwondo Federation records showed that Chuang missed three doping tests in 2017, resulting in her suspension.

References

External links
 

Living people
Taiwanese female taekwondo practitioners
Asian Games medalists in taekwondo
Taekwondo practitioners at the 2010 Asian Games
Taekwondo practitioners at the 2014 Asian Games
Asian Games bronze medalists for Chinese Taipei
1989 births
Taekwondo practitioners at the 2016 Summer Olympics
Medalists at the 2014 Asian Games
Universiade medalists in taekwondo
Taiwanese sportsperson-politicians
Universiade silver medalists for Chinese Taipei
Olympic taekwondo practitioners of Taiwan
World Taekwondo Championships medalists
Asian Taekwondo Championships medalists
Medalists at the 2015 Summer Universiade
Medalists at the 2017 Summer Universiade
21st-century Taiwanese women